Andrew John Bailey (born 30 March 1959) is a British central banker who has been Governor of the Bank of England since 16 March 2020.

Previously he served as the Chief Cashier of the Bank of England from January 2004 until April 2011, Deputy Governor of the Bank of England for Prudential Regulation from April 2013 to July 2016 and Chief Executive of the Financial Conduct Authority from 2016 to 2020.

Education

Bailey attended Wyggeston Boys' Grammar School, Leicester, from where he went to Queens' College, Cambridge, where he gained a bachelor's degree in History (promoted to MA by seniority in 1985) and a PhD from the Faculty of History, University of Cambridge in 1984 with a thesis on The impact of the Napoleonic Wars on the development of the cotton industry in Lancashire: a study of the structure and behaviour of firms during the Industrial Revolution.

Career

After university, Bailey became a research officer at the London School of Economics, before joining the Bank of England in 1985.

He has worked at the Bank of England in a number of areas, most recently as executive director for banking services and as Chief Cashier, as well as head of the bank's Special Resolution Unit (SRU). Previous roles include Governor's private secretary, and head of the International Economic Analysis Division in Monetary Analysis.

Between the onset of the financial crisis in August 2007 and until April 2011, Bailey was responsible for the bank's special operations to resolve problems in the banking sector, and in 2009 was chairman and chief executive of Dunfermline Building Society Bridge Bank Ltd. 
 
On 1 April 2013, Bailey became the chief executive of the new Prudential Regulation Authority and the first deputy governor of the Bank of England for Prudential Regulation.

On 26 January 2016, it was announced that Andrew Bailey would take over as CEO of the UK Financial Conduct Authority. He replaced Tracey McDermott, who became acting CEO after Martin Wheatley resigned following a vote of no confidence by George Osborne in July 2015.

In September 2019, allegations were made of Bailey falling asleep during a meeting between campaigners acting on behalf of the British Steel Pension Scheme (BSPS) and the FCA and of him failing to take swift action to protect those affected by what would become one of the UK's biggest pension mis-selling scandals. A subsequent National Audit Office probe into the case concluded that members of the BSPS suffered significant financial losses because the FCA failed to take action on numerous reports of some FCA-authorised firms giving unsuitable transfer advice. This led to parliamentarians commenting that the FCA was asleep at the wheel.

In March 2020, the Treasury Select Committee criticised the performance of the Financial Conduct Authority. The committee said it would monitor closely the culture, operations and transparency of the FCA. This followed damning criticisms of the watchdog by consumer and industry groups during Bailey’s tenure as its chief executive.

On 3 June 2019, it was reported in The Times that Bailey was the favourite to replace Mark Carney as the new governor of the Bank of England. Sajid Javid had also intervened in support of Bailey. According to The Economist: "He is widely seen within the bank as a safe pair of hands, an experienced technocrat who knows how to manage an organisation."

In 2021, Bailey objected to the title of a report by the House of Lords' Economic Affairs Committee, "Quantitative easing: a dangerous addiction?", saying "[Addiction] is a word that has a very damaging and particular meaning to many people who are suffering. I think it is wrong to use that word loosely, and frankly I think it was a very poor choice of language".

In February 2022, Bailey faced criticism from union leaders over his comments asking workers not to demand a pay rise, in the context of the current cost-of-living crisis. When pressed by parliamentarians as to Bailey's salary (in contrast to the average earnings of care workers) Bailey replied with an approximate figure of £500,000, also stating "I can't tell you exactly what it is, I don't carry that around in my head".

In May 2022, Bailey stated that rising food prices is a "major worry" for the UK and other countries. He stated how it "is a major, major worry and it's not just I have to tell you a major worry for this country. There's a major worry for the developing world as well. And so if I had to sort of, sorry for being apocalyptic for a moment, but that is a major concern." Bailey said the war in Ukraine was affecting food supplies.

Following the "mini-budget", Bailey said on Monday that the BoE "will not hesitate" to raise interest rates if needed to meet its 2% inflation target, and that it was watching financial markets "very closely" following sharp moves in asset prices.

His term will expire on 15 March 2028.

Personal life 
He is married to Cheryl Schonhardt-Bailey, professor of political science and head of the Department of Government at the London School of Economics and Political Science (LSE).

References

External links
 Profile at the FSA

1959 births
Alumni of Queens' College, Cambridge
Governors of the Bank of England
Chief Cashiers of the Bank of England
Deputy Governors of the Bank of England
Financial Conduct Authority people
Living people
People associated with the Bank of England
People educated at Wyggeston Grammar School for Boys